Tors may refer to:

 Tor (rock formation), rock outcrops
 Ivan Tors (1916–1983), playwright, screenwriter and film and television producer
 TransOral Robotic Surgery, a surgical technique

See also
 Tor (disambiguation)
 Ten Tors
 Tors Cove, Newfoundland and Labrador